The 32nd District of the Iowa Senate is located in northeast Iowa, and is currently composed of Black Hawk, Bremer, Buchanan, and Fayette Counties.

Current elected officials
Craig Johnson is the senator currently representing the 32nd District.

The area of the 32nd District contains two Iowa House of Representatives districts:
The 63rd District (represented by Sandy Salmon)
The 64th District (represented by Chad Ingels)

The district is also located in Iowa's 1st congressional district, which is represented by Ashley Hinson.

Past senators
The district has previously been represented by:

Forrest Schwengels, 1983–1988
H. Kay Hedge, 1989–1992
Randal Giannetto, 1993–1996
Larry McKibben, 1997–2002
Jack Holveck, 2003–2004
Brad Zaun, 2005–2012
Brian Schoenjahn, 2013–2016
Craig Johnson, 2017–present

See also
Iowa General Assembly
Iowa Senate

References

32